Sébastien Roch (born 3 December 1972, in Toulouse) is a French actor, singer and television host. He achieved notability with his role of Christian in the TV series Hélène et les Garçons and Les Vacances de l'amour. He had also a success with his 1993 single, "Au Bar de Jess", which peaked at number 17 in France.

Filmography

Cinema
 1992 : Les Paroles invisibles
 1997 : La Fin de la nuit
 2000 : In extremis
 2003 : Le Principe du canapé
 2004 : Prisonnier
 2005 : Ze Film
 2005 : Rue des Vertus

Television
 1991 : Cas de divorce (TV series) – as Mr. Laurier
 1992–1994 : Hélène et les Garçons (TV series) – as Christian
 1995 : Fils de flic
 2004 : Les Vacances de l'amour (TV series) – Christian
 2006 : Sous le soleil (TV series) – as Tony
 2007 : King Size – as Pierre
 2007 : Baie des flamboyants saison 1 (TV series)
 2008 : SOS 18 (TV series)
 2008 : Disparitions (TV series)
 2009 : Comprendre et pardonner (TV series)
 2010 : Les Mystères de l'amour (TV series)

Discography

Albums
 1993 : Silences
 2007 : Puce de luxe

Singles
 1993 : "Le Bar de Jess" – #17 in France
 1993 : "Pousse petit vent"
 2007 : "Mes sandales"

Presenter
 Since 6 April 2009 : IDF1 Matin, with Laly Meignan

References

21st-century French male singers
Living people
1972 births
21st-century French singers
French pop singers
French-language singers
French male television actors
French television presenters
Male actors from Toulouse